Le Gendarme incompris (The misunderstood Gendarme) is a one-act play written in 1920 by Jean Cocteau and Raymond Radiguet and set to music by Francis Poulenc, his FP 20a.

The play features three characters: Commissaire Médor played by Pierre Bertin), a gendarme named the Penultimate whose replicas are from a poem in the Divagations by Stéphane Mallarmé, and an old lady, the Marquise de Montonson.

It was played publicly only once, on 24 May 1921, in addition to the dress rehearsal the day before. Two more performances were scheduled for 25 and 26 May.

Suite 
Poulenc derived a suite for orchestra drawn from the incidental music, which was first performed in London on 11 July 1921, conducted by Ernest Ansermet).

The work comprises 3 movements for double bass, cello, violin, clarinet, trumpet and trombone:

 I. Ouverture 
 II. Madrigal 
 III. Final

The duration is about 6:35 minutes

Notes

References

External links 
 Le Gendarme incompris on YouYube
 Le Gendarme incompris on data.bnf.fr
 Le gendarme incompris (suite), FP 20b on IMSLP
 Le Gendarme incompris
 Poulenc: Le Gendarme Incompris - Comédie-bouffe en un acte mêlée de chants - Scène 2 - "Enfin cette ridicule comédie va cesser" on Amazon

Plays by Jean Cocteau
1920 plays
Compositions by Francis Poulenc